Lathosterolosis is a defect in cholesterol biosynthesis.

See also
 SC5DL
 Lathosterol

References

External links 

Cholesterol and steroid metabolism disorders